Wings of the Storm is a 1926 American "dog-hero" drama film directed by John G. Blystone and written by Elizabeth Pickett Chevalier, Gordon Rigby, and Dorothy Yost. Released in November 1926 by Fox Film Corporation, the film showcases Thunder the Marvel Dog with support from costars William Russell, Virginia Brown Faire, and Reed Howes.

Cast   
Thunder the Marvel Dog as Thunder
Virginia Brown Faire as Anita Baker
Reed Howes as Allen Gregory
William Russell as Bill Martin
Hank Mann as Red Jones 
White Fawn the Dog as White Fawn

References

External links

1926 films
1920s English-language films
Silent American drama films
1926 drama films
Fox Film films
Films directed by John G. Blystone
American silent feature films
American black-and-white films
1920s American films